The Battle of Olivento was fought on 17 March 1041 between the Byzantine Empire and the Normans of southern Italy and their Lombard allies near the Olivento river, between the actual Basilicata and Apulia, southern Italy.

History
The battle had its origin in the decision of Arduin the Lombard, a Greek-speaking Lombard who had fought for the Byzantines, to change sides and form a coalition with the Normans Rainulf Drengot and the Hauteville brothers (William Iron Arm, Drogo, Humphrey), and the Lombards Atenulf of Benevento and Argyrus of Bari. Once having defeated the imperial armies, they would take for themselves the conquered lands.

The Byzantine catepan of Italy, Michael Dokeianos, moved from Bari with the few troops he could muster, including some Varangians, troops from the Opsikion tagma and several Thracesians. He was able to defeat the first rebel troops he met, and he pursued them at Ascoli Satriano. Here he was met by an army of 300 Norman Knights and 600 infantry under Rainulf Drengot, Arduin and William Iron Arm. Prior to the battle Dokeianos sent an envoy to the Lombard-Norman army to give them a choice of returning to Lombard territory or to fight the numerically superior Byzantine Army. Once the envoy was done giving the terms, Hugh Touboeuf, the Norman knight who had been holding the reins to the envoy's mount-killed the horse by hitting it in the back of the head with his gauntlet. After the envoy was given another horse he was sent back to Dokeianos with the Normans' reply choosing battle.

The rebels had deployed the cavalry in the centre, with the infantry on the wings. The Byzantines launched several waves of attacks against the Norman cavalry. However, the Normans resisted and counter-attacked, defeating the Byzantines with a decisive cavalry charge. The Greek troops fled, and many of them drowned in the river. The catepan himself was barely able to escape alive.

The battle of Olivento was the first of the numerous successes scored by the Normans in their conquest of southern Italy. After the battle, they conquered Ascoli, Venosa,  Gravina di Puglia. It was followed by other Normans victories over the Byzantines in the battles of Montemaggiore and Montepeloso.

References

Bibliography

1041 in Europe
1040s in the Byzantine Empire
Olivento
Olivento
Olivento
Olivento
Catepanate of Italy
Olivento